Leo J. Nowicki (February 17, 1904 – September 5, 1990) was an American politician who served as the 41st lieutenant governor of Michigan from 1937 to 1939.

References

1904 births
1990 deaths
Lieutenant Governors of Michigan
Michigan Democrats
20th-century American politicians